Arcyria is a genus of Amoebozoa in the family Arcyriaceae. It includes the species Arcyria ferruginea .

Species

Arcyria affinis
Arcyria afroalpina
Arcyria aggregata
Arcyria annulifera
Arcyria aureoglobosa
Arcyria biniensis
Arcyria brooksii
Arcyria bulbosa
Arcyria cinerea
Arcyria colloderma
Arcyria corymbosa
Arcyria denudata
Arcyria exigua
Arcyria fasciculata
Arcyria ferruginea
Arcyria flavescens
Arcyria fuegiana
Arcyria galericulata
Arcyria glauca
Arcyria globosa
Arcyria gongyloida
Arcyria helvetica
Arcyria imperialis
Arcyria incarnata
Arcyria insignis
Arcyria magna
Arcyria major
Arcyria marginoundulata
Arcyria minuta
Arcyria monticola
Arcyria nepalensis
Arcyria nigella
Arcyria obvelata
Arcyria occidentalis
Arcyria oerstedii
Arcyria oerstedioides
Arcyria olivaceoglobosa
Arcyria papilla
Arcyria pausiaca
Arcyria poeltii
Arcyria pomiformis
Arcyria pseudodenudata
Arcyria riparia
Arcyria rubrobrunnea
Arcyria rufosa
Arcyria stipata
Arcyria sulcata
Arcyria verrucosituba
Arcyria versicolor
Arcyria virescens

References

Amoebozoa genera
Myxogastria